Mask is a 1938 Soviet drama film directed by Sergei Sploshnov.

Plot 
The film tells is based on the eponymous story by Anton Chekhov.

Starring 
 Konstantin Adashevsky	
 Aleksandr Benyaminov	
 Pyotr Gofman
 Stepan Kayukov	
 Nikolay Litvinov
 Ivan Nazarov		
 Vitali Politseymako	
 Vladimir Taskin

References

External links 

1938 films
1930s Russian-language films
Soviet drama films
1938 drama films
Soviet black-and-white films